Titanium(III) sulfide, also called dititanium trisulfide or titanium sesquisulfide, is a chemical compound with the formula Ti2S3.

Preparation 
Titanium(III) sulfide is obtained from titanium disulfide, TiS2, by heating at 1000 °C in a vacuum or by reduction with hydrogen at high temperatures. It can also be synthesized by direct combination of the elements under pressure or at 800 °C.

Properties 
Titanium(III) sulfide is a black powder that can also be crystalline or shiny. The crystal has the nickel arsenide structure (hexagonal close-packed), with a coordination number of 6 for titanium.

Titanium(III) sulfide is air- and water-stable at normal temperatures and unlike titanium disulfide does not give off an odor of hydrogen sulfide.

In hot sulfuric acid, Ti2S3 first forms a blue-gray slurry and then a colorless solution, while in cold concentrated sulfuric or nitric acid it forms a green-colored solution. With hot hydrochloric acid it forms hydrogen sulfide.

References 

Titanium compounds
Sulfides